3G Love is a 2013 Indian Telugu-language romantic drama film directed by Govardhan Krishna, produced by Pratap Kolagatla and starring newcomers. The film is about the romantic relationships of the hi-tech generation. The film released on 15 March 2013.

Cast 
The cast features twenty six newcomers (including Ashrith, Atul, Avinash, Ayush, Harsh, Deborah, Jyothi, Neelima, Nidhi, and Preeti), Rao Ramesh (as Shanti's father), and Prabhas Sreenu (as a park broker).

Production
The film is produced by sQuareindia Group Managing Director Pratap Kolagatla. According to the director Govardhan Krishna, 3G Love means 3rd Generation love or 3rd Grade love and the three G's are girls, guys and greed.

The film features 26 debutants15 male actors and 11 actresses. These actors were selected through auditions in Hyderabad and Vizag. 3G Love was shot in 51 days.

Music
Music composed by Sekhar Chandra.

Reception
Karthik Pasupulate from The Times of India opined that "It just seems like a bunch of adolescents who just discovered the joys of non-vegetarian jokes came together to write the dialogues. The sense of humor is with the lack of a better word, just too "hormonal". There really isn't any story". Jeevi of Idlebrain.com said that "On a whole, 3G Love is not a film: it's more like a debate and a case study with adult content thrown in". Mahesh S. Koneru of 123telugu stated that "This film is an assault on the intelligence of viewers. Bad writing, bad acting and a non-existent plot leave a very bad taste in the mouth". Shekhar Hooli of Filmibeat gave a positive review and said that "The movie 3G Love is a romance drama with lot of fun and comedy to lure the youth. The actors' performances, Venkatapathy's screenplay, dialogues and narration, Shekar Chandra's melodious music, Sai Sri Ram's cinematography and beautiful locales are the highlights of the movie.

Box office
The film ran for 25 days.

References